The women's 500 meter at the 2012 KNSB Dutch Single Distance Championships took place in Heerenveen at the Thialf ice skating rink on 4–5 November 2011. Although this edition was held in 2011, it was part of the 2011–2012 speed skating season.

There were 22 participants who raced twice over 500m so that all skaters had to start once in the inner lane and once in the outer lane. There was a qualification selection incentive for the next following 2011–12 ISU Speed Skating World Cup tournaments.

Title holder was Margot Boer.

Overview

Result

  WDR = Withdrew
 * = Fell

Draw 1st 500m

Draw 2nd 500m

Source:

References

Single Distance Championships
2012 Single Distance
World